Félix Rafael Alonso Expósito (born 29 December 2000) is a Spanish footballer who plays as a central midfielder for SD Tarazona, on loan from CD Tenerife.

Club career
Born in Santa Cruz de Tenerife, Canary Islands, Alonso represented CD Tenerife, CD Llamoro and CD Sobradillo as a youth. In 2019, after finishing his formation, he joined Tercera División side CD Santa Úrsula.

Alonso made his senior debut on 25 August 2019, coming on as a second-half substitute in a 1–1 away draw against UD Lanzarote. He scored his first senior goal on 28 September, netting his team's third in a 3–1 home win against UD Las Palmas C.

On 23 June 2020, Alonso returned to Tenerife and was assigned to the B-team also in the fourth division. He made his first team debut on 29 May of the following year, replacing fellow youth graduate Javi Alonso in a 2–2 home draw against Real Oviedo in the Segunda División championship.

References

External links

2000 births
Living people
Footballers from Santa Cruz de Tenerife
Spanish footballers
Association football midfielders
Segunda División players
Segunda Federación players
Tercera División players
Tercera Federación players
CD Tenerife B players
CD Tenerife players
SD Tarazona footballers